Pucajirca or Pucahirca (possibly from Quechua puka red, Ancash Quechua hirka mountain, "red mountain") is a mountain in the Cordillera Blanca in the Andes of Peru, about 6,046 m (19,836 ft) high. It is located in the Ancash Region, Pomabamba Province, Pomabamba District (Pucajirca Norte) as well as in the Huaylas Province, Yuracmarca District (Pucajirca Central) north of Rinrijirca. Its slopes are within Huascarán National Park.

The mountain has three separate and independent summits: Pucajirca Norte (6,046 m), Central (6,014 m) and Oeste (6,039 m). The current DEM data has no enough evidence to confirm its official altitude.

First Ascent 
The summit of Pucajirca Norte was first achieved on July 14, 1955, by Nick Clinch and Andrew Kauffman II (USA), also two days later by Harvey McMannis and David Sowles (USA). Erwin Schneider summited Pucajirca Oeste in the 1930s.

See also 
 Arhuaycocha
 Pucacocha
 Taullicocha
 Taulliraju

References

Six-thousanders of the Andes
Mountains of Peru
Mountains of Ancash Region